Dorsze  is a village in the administrative district of Gmina Kalinowo, within Ełk County, Warmian-Masurian Voivodeship, in northern Poland.

The village has a population of 100.

Notable residents
Elfriede Mohneke (1922-1994), KZ guard

References

Villages in Ełk County